,  or  is a mountain and the main peak in the Okuchichibu Range in Kantō Mountains  in the South Japan Alps. It is located in  Chichibu-Tama-Kai National Park on the boundary of Nagano Prefecture and Yamanashi Prefecture, Japan.
It has sacred Gojoiwa rock, a Shinto holy site, on it top and is one of the 100 Famous Japanese Mountains. At 2599 m tall, it is the second highest peak of the Okuchichibu Mountains.

Access 
First take a bus bound for Masutomi Hot Spring (増富温泉). Second take a bus bound for Mizugakisansou (瑞牆山荘). Look for direct bus to the trailhead. It might be available depending on the season.

Gallery

References

See also
Mount Mizugaki
Ōdarumi Pass
100 Famous Japanese Mountains

Kinpu
Kinpu